636 Erika is a minor planet orbiting the Sun.

References

External links
 
 

Background asteroids
19070208
Erika
Erika